Gibsonburg High School is a public high school in Gibsonburg, Ohio.  It is the only high school in the Gibsonburg Exempted Village School District.  Their nickname is the Golden Bears.  They are members of the SBC (River Division), after having competed for many years in the TAAC and SLL

Ohio High School Athletic Association State Championships
 Boys Baseball – 2005 
 Girls Softball – 2001, 2002, 2003

Notable alumni
Nina McClelland – Dean Emeritus and former professor of chemistry at the University of Toledo
Larry Arndt - professional baseball player
Tony Kern - film director, screenwriter, motion picture artist and film producer
Ted Smith - All-American football player 1975 at The Ohio State University

Notes and references

External links
 District Website

High schools in Sandusky County, Ohio
Public high schools in Ohio